Abdullah Othman (born December 10, 1990) is a Saudi football player who plays a winger for Al-Safa.

References

1990 births
Living people
Saudi Arabian footballers
Al-Hazem F.C. players
Al-Qadsiah FC players
Hajer FC players
Ohod Club players
Al-Kholood Club players
Bisha FC players
Al Safa FC players
Place of birth missing (living people)
Saudi First Division League players
Saudi Professional League players
Saudi Second Division players
Association football wingers